Elections were held in Illinois on Tuesday, November 7, 1950.

Primaries were held April 11, 1950.

Election information
1950 was a midterm election year in the United States.

Turnout
In the primary election 1,789,787 ballots were cast (912,563 Democratic and 877,224 Republican).

In the general election 3,731,618 ballots were cast.

Federal elections

United States Senate 

Incumbent Senate Majority Leader Scott W. Lucas, a two-term incumbent Democratic senator, lost reelection to Republican Everett Dirksen.

United States House 

All 26 Illinois seats in the United States House of Representatives were up for election in 1950.

Republicans flipped four Republican-held seats, leaving the Illinois House delegation to consist of 18 Republicans and 8 Democrats.

State elections

Treasurer 

Incumbent first-term Treasurer, Democrat Ora Smith, did not seek reelection, instead running for Clerk of the Supreme Court. Republican William Stratton was elected to succeed him, earning Stratton a second non-consecutive term as Treasurer.

Democratic primary

Republican primary
Former Illinois Treasurer and congressman William Stratton won the Republican primary. He defeated Cook County Treasurer Louis E. Nelson, former congressman James Simpson Jr., fellow former Illinois Treasurer Warren E. Wright, Chicago alderman Theron W. Merryman, among others.

General election

Superintendent of Public Instruction 

Incumbent  Superintendent of Public Instruction Vernon L. Nickell, a Republican, was reelected to a third term.

Democratic primary

Republican primary

General election

Clerk of the Supreme Court 

Incumbent Clerk of the Supreme Court Earle Benjamin Searcy, a Republican, was reelected.

Democratic primary
Illinois Treasurer Ora Smith won the Democratic primary, running unopposed.

Republican primary
Incumbent Earle Benjamin Searcy won the Republican primary, defeating three challengers.

General election

State Senate
Seats in the Illinois Senate were up for election in 1950. Republicans flipped control of the chamber.

State House of Representatives
Seats in the Illinois House of Representatives were up for election in 1950. Republicans remained in control of the chamber.

Trustees of University of Illinois

An election was held for three of nine seats for Trustees of University of Illinois. 

New Republican members Harold "Red" Grange Wayne A. Johnston, and Herbert B. Megran were elected.

Second-term Democrat Karl A. Meyer lost reelection. Democrat Kenney E. Williamson (serving his first full, and second overall term) also lost reelection. Incumbent first-term Democrat Walter W. McLaughlin was not nominated for reelection, with former member Harold Pogue nominated instead.

Judicial elections
On April 11, two special elections were held, one to fill a vacancy of the Circuit Court of Cook County and one to fill a vacancy on the Superior Court of Cook County.

Ballot measure
One measure was put before voters in 1950, a legislatively referred constitutional amendment.

In order to be approved, it required approval equal to a majority of voters voting in the entire general election.

Illinois Gateway Amendment
The Illinois Gateway Amendment, a legislatively referred constitutional amendment to Section 2 of Article XIV of the Constitution, was approved by voters. It made it so that the legislature would be able to propose modifications of up to three articles of the constitution per session, and also made it so that future constitutional amendments would require either a two-thirds vote of the voters voting on the question or a majority of voter voting in the election.

Local elections
Local elections were held.

References

 
Illinois